Badel 1862 d.d. is a Croatian alcoholic beverage company headquartered in Zagreb.

Today's Badel originated following the Second World War, after the communist government nationalized the companies Pokorny, Patria, Arko, Marijan Badel, and Badel-Vinoprodukt. In March 2011, Badel took over Eurobev d.o.o., which produces fruit juices and soft drinks.

Brands

Badel 1862 produces some of the regionally most recognizable alcoholic brands, including:
 Spirits: Pelinkovac, Vigor Vodka, Travarica, Stara Šljivovica, William's, Loza, Prima Brand (formerly Prima Brandy), Glembay Vinjak, Cezar Vinjak, Zrinski Vinjak, Sax Gin
 Wines: Graševina Daruvar, Postup, Dingač, Ivan Dolac, Korlat
 Soft drinks: Voćko, Inka, Nara

Badel 1862 is also the distribution company for major alcohol and soft drink brands, such as:
 Rum: Bacardi
 Tequila: Sierra Tequila
 Amaro: Amaro 18 Isolabella
 Gin: Bombay Sapphire
 Whisky: Dewar's
 Amaretto: Disaronno
 Cognac: Otard Cognac
 Vodka: Grey Goose
 Coffee liqueur: Tia Maria
 Vermouth: Martini
 Soft drinks: Pepsi Cola, 7 Up, Mirinda

References

External links
 

Drink companies of Croatia
Companies established in 1862
Croatian brands
Establishments in the Kingdom of Croatia (Habsburg)
1862 establishments in the Austrian Empire
Manufacturing companies based in Zagreb